Steve Kuclo is an American bodybuilder.

Early life
Kuclo was born on August 15, 1985 in Detroit, Michigan.

Current personal life
   Steve Kuclo is married to Michelle Sylvia Kuclo, as of August 2022. He is a IFBB 5x Champion Professional Bodybuilder, serial entrepreneur, and leadership coach. 
He previously worked as a Firefighter/Paramedic for Dallas Fire & Rescue. He retired in 2016 and is no longer an active firefighter/medic.
Steve previously co-owned the Shark Tank affiliated clothing company, BootyQueen Apparel LLC. Steve is also an owner of Kuclo Productions LLC which hosts and promotes the Kuclo Classic bodybuilding shows in Dallas, Michigan, and Wyoming. 
   Steve Kuclo also excels as a business and life coach hosting personal development events called "Upgraded Human Mastermind". He hosts this event annually in May along side the Kuclo Classic and hosts mastermind groups year round. 

Kuclo sat for an exclusive interview with writer Rod Labbe in 2011. Entitled "Diamond in the Rough," it saw print in the November 2011 edition of IronMan magazine.

Videography
 2011 - The Future Of Bodybuilding

Competitive History
2004 NPC Capital City Classic 1st Place Teen, Teen Overall, 3rd Place Men's Heavyweight
2004 NPC Michigan Bodybuilding State Championships 1st Place Teen, Teen Overall, 4th Place Men's Heavyweight
2004 NPC Teen Nationals 1st Place Heavyweight Division
2005 NPC Collegiate Nationals HeavyWeight, 3rd
2005 NPC Michigan Championships Teen, 1st
2005 NPC Michigan Championships HeavyWeight, 5th
2005 Teen Nationals HeavyWeight, 1st
2007 North American Championships Super-HeavyWeight, 8th
2008 NPC Nationals Super-HeavyWeight, 3rd
2009 NPC Nationals Super-HeavyWeight, 13th
2010 NPC Nationals Super-HeavyWeight, 3rd
2010 NPC USA Championships Super-HeavyWeight, 6th
2011 NPC USA Men's Super-Heavyweight, Overall 1st (Turned Pro) 
 2012 NY Pro, 2nd place
 2013 Dallas Europa Super Show Men's Open, 1st
2013 Mr. Olympia, 14th
2014 Arnold Classic Brazil, 1st
2014 Finland Pro, 2nd Place
2014 San Marino Pro, 7th place
2014 EVLS Prague Pro, 5th place
2014 Dubai Open, 4th place
2014 Mr. Olympia, 9th place
2015 Wing of Strength, Texas Pro 2nd place 
2015 Mr. Olympia, 16th place
2016 NY Pro, 3rd Place
2016 California Pro, 1st Place
2018 Arnold Classic, 5th Place
2018 Indy Pro, 1st Place
2018 Mr. Olympia, 10th Place
2019 Arnold Classic, 6th Place
2019 Indy Pro, 1st Place
2019 Mr. Olympia, 6th Place
2020 Arnold Classic, 4th Place
2021 Texas Pro, 2nd Place 
2021 Arnold Classic, 3rd Place
2022 Arnold Classic, 3rd Place
2023 Texas Pro, 3nd Place

References

 
 
 

American bodybuilders
American people of Polish descent
People from Macomb County, Michigan
Living people
1985 births
Sportspeople from Metro Detroit